Ednam is an unincorporated community in Albemarle County, Virginia.

Ednam House was added to the National Register of Historic Places in 1982.

References

Unincorporated communities in Virginia
Unincorporated communities in Albemarle County, Virginia